
Krotoszyn County is a unit of territorial administration and local government (powiat) in Greater Poland Voivodeship, west-central Poland. It came into being on January 1, 1999, as a result of the Polish local government reforms passed in 1998.

As of 2006 its total population is 77,092, out of which the population of Krotoszyn is 29,421, that of Koźmin Wielkopolski is 6,707, that of Zduny is 4,498, that of Kobylin is 3,084, that of Sulmierzyce is 2,772, and the rural population is 30,610.

Neighbouring counties
Krotoszyn County is bordered by Jarocin County to the north, Pleszew County to the north-east, Ostrów Wielkopolski County to the east, Milicz County to the south, Rawicz County to the west and Gostyń County to the north-west.

Administrative division
The county is subdivided into six gminas (one urban, four urban-rural and one rural). These are listed in the following table, in descending order of population.

References
Polish official population figures 2006

 
Krotoszyn